The Voice Kids is a Polish reality music talent show for aspiring singers aged 8 to 14, airing on TVP 2. The fifth season premiered on February 26, 2022. Tomson & Baron, Dawid Kwiatkowski and Cleo returned as the coaches. Tomasz Kammel returned as host, alongside Ida Nowakowska-Herndon. Mateusz Krzykała won the season, marking Cleo’s second win as a coach.

Coaches

Teams 

 Colour key

Blind auditions 
 
 Color key

Episode 1 (February 26, 2022) 
Ania Dąbrowska, Marcin Maciejczak and Sara Egwu-James performed "Lecę"

Episode 2 (February 26, 2022) 
Roksana Węgiel performed "Korona"

Episode 3 (March 5, 2022) 
Natalia Kawalec performed "Not Giving Up"

Episode 4 (March 5, 2022)

Episode 5 (March 12, 2022) 
Jakub Szmajkowski performed "Nieskończone"

Episode 6 (March 12, 2022)

Episode 7 (March 19, 2022) 
Alicja Tracz performed "Nic nie musisz"

Episode 8 (March 19, 2022) 
Amelia Andryszczyk performed "Loczki"

Episode 9 (March 26, 2022) 
Wiktoria Zwolińska performed "Klony"

Episode 10 (March 26, 2022)

The Battle Rounds 
Color key

Episode 11: Team Dawid (April 2, 2022) 
The Dawid's group performed "Don't Worry, Be Happy" at the start of the show.

 
Sing offs

Episode 12: Team Cleo (April 9, 2022) 
The Cleo's group performed "Bastet" at the start of the show.

 
Sing offs

Episode 13: Team Tomson & Baron (April 16, 2022) 
The Tomson & Baron's group performed "With a Little Help from My Friends" at the start of the show.

 
Sing offs

Episode 14 Finale 
Color key

Round 1  (April 23, 2022) 

Each contestant performed a duet with their judge.

Round 2  (April 23, 2022) 
Each contestant performed a cover and their original song.

Elimination chart 
 
 Colour key
 Artist's info

 
 Result details

Teams 
 
 Color key
 Artist's info

 
 Results details

References

The Voice of Poland